John Aloysius Quinn (August 29, 1897 - July 4, 1968) was a professional baseball umpire who worked in the American League from 1935 to 1942. Quinn was an umpire in the 1937 Major League Baseball All-Star Game. In his career, he umpired 1,247 Major League games.

References

External links
 Umpire Card
 

1897 births
1968 deaths
Major League Baseball umpires
Sportspeople from Pennsylvania